Jean-Claude Guibal (13 January 1941 – 25 October 2021) was a member of the National Assembly of France. From 1997 to 2017, he represented the 4th constituency of the Alpes-Maritimes department, and was a member of The Republicans since 2015. From 1989 until his death in 2021, he served as mayor of Menton during 6 consecutive terms.

References

1941 births
2021 deaths
Knights of the Ordre national du Mérite
Union for a Popular Movement politicians
The Republicans (France) politicians
Deputies of the 11th National Assembly of the French Fifth Republic
Deputies of the 12th National Assembly of the French Fifth Republic
Deputies of the 13th National Assembly of the French Fifth Republic
Deputies of the 14th National Assembly of the French Fifth Republic
HEC Paris alumni
Sciences Po alumni
École nationale d'administration alumni
Politicians from Ajaccio
Mayors of places in Provence-Alpes-Côte d'Azur